Uzovský Šalgov is a village and municipality in Sabinov District in the Prešov Region of north-eastern Slovakia.

History
In historical records the village was first mentioned in 1314.

Geography
The municipality lies at an elevation of 361 metres and covers an area of 6.429 km². It has a population of about 570 people.

External links
https://web.archive.org/web/20070513023228/http://www.statistics.sk/mosmis/eng/run.html

Villages and municipalities in Sabinov District